Antal Székely (born 9 September 1959) is a Hungarian sailor. He competed in the Finn event at the 1988 Summer Olympics.

References

External links
 
 

1959 births
Living people
Sportspeople from Pécs
Hungarian male sailors (sport)
Olympic sailors of Hungary
Sailors at the 1988 Summer Olympics – Finn